The College Dropout Video Anthology is a DVD release featuring the music videos to the singles from American rapper Kanye West's debut studio album The College Dropout (2004), released on March 22, 2005. It featured the videos to the previously unreleased "Two Words", "Slow Jamz", "Through the Wire", "All Falls Down", the three versions of "Jesus Walks", and "The New Workout Plan".

West has said on many occasions that he feels the imagery of his music videos are very important to him and an integral part to his art. He contributed to the direction of the videos for "All Falls Down" and three versions of "Jesus Walks".

The initial music video for "Jesus Walks" was rejected by MTV and other networks for being inappropriate for airing, so West made an alternate version for MTV. A third video was also made, although rarely seen before this DVD.

It was accompanied by a bonus audio CD that featured seven otherwise unreleased songs by West. Three are remixes or reprises of songs from The College Dropout, two are alternate instrumental versions of Dropout tracks, and two ("It's Alright" and "Heavy Hitters") were previously unreleased originals.

On June 12, 2006, the DVD/CD set was certified Gold by the RIAA. Such an honor was declared once the album surpassed the 50,000 units sold mark.

Chapter Listing

Sample credits 
 "We Don't Care" contains samples from "I Just Wanna Stop" performed by The Jimmy Castor Bunch.
 "Jesus Walks" (Remix) contains a sample of "Walk With Me" performed by The Arc Choir.
 "Two Words" contains a sample of "Peace And Love (Amani Na Mapenzi) - Movement IV (Encounter)" performed by Mandrill.
"Never Let Me Down" contains an interpolation of "Maybe It's The Power Of Love", written by Michael Bolton and Bruce Kulick

Certifications

References

External links

Roc-A-Fella: Album Certified Gold
BBC's Kanye West Discography, featuring The College Dropout Video Anthology
MTV.com Page for The College Dropout Video Anthology under Kanye West discography
Reviews
AllMusic Review 

Kanye West albums
Albums produced by Kanye West
2005 compilation albums
2005 video albums
Music video compilation albums
Roc-A-Fella Records video albums
Def Jam Recordings video albums